Amy Entelis is the Executive Vice President for Talent and Content Development for CNN Worldwide. She leads the development, production, and acquisition of original, long-form premium content for the network. Entelis is the senior talent executive at CNN and is responsible for the recruitment and development of all on-air correspondents, anchors, and contributors for CNN programming and global platforms.

Biography
Entelis was born Amy Lynn Radwell, the daughter of Jeanne and Louis Radwell, on Long Island, NY. Entelis graduated from Vassar College, where she majored in psychology, and later attended Columbia University, where she earned a Master of Science in Journalism.

Entelis began her career in television journalism at ABC News as a producer for the weekly news magazine 20/20 and then as a producer at World News Tonight with Peter Jennings. During her thirty-year tenure, Entelis worked in various roles of increasing responsibility, ultimately serving as senior vice president for talent strategy, development, and research. She recruited and managed talent for the network's most high-profile news programs including Good Morning America, World News Tonight, Nightline, and 20/20. While at ABC News, Entelis received several journalism honors, including a National News Emmy, a DuPont-Columbia Award, a Planned Parenthood Media Excellence Award, the Headliner Award from the Association for Women in Communications, and a Front Page Award from the Newswomen's Club of New York for Distinguished Journalism.

In 2012, Entelis joined CNN. Under her leadership, CNN launched four premium content brands for the network's global platforms: CNN Original Series and HLN Original Series, for which Entelis and her team develop nonfiction programming; CNN Films, for which Entelis produces and acquires documentary films for festival, theatrical, broadcast, and streaming distribution; and CNN Films Presents, for which Entelis acquires encore runs of notable documentary films for broadcast on CNN. 

Entelis is credited with building the CNN Original Series brand, bringing to audiences the 13-time Primetime Emmy Award winner Parts Unknown with Anthony Bourdain; Stanley Tucci: Searching for Italy, winner of the 2021 Primetime Emmy Award for Outstanding Hosted Nonfiction Series; This is Life with Lisa Ling; the five-time Primetime Emmy Award-winning, United Shades of America with W. Kamau Bell; the Primetime Emmy Award-nominated "Decades Series": The Sixties, The Seventies, The Eighties, The Nineties, The 2000s, executive produced by Tom Hanks, Gary Goetzman, and Mark Herzog; the forthcoming Eva Longoria: Searching for Mexico; and many others.

Notable CNN Films executive produced by Entelis include Navalny, directed by Daniel Roher, about the attempted assassination of Russian opposition leader, Alexey Navalny, which won the Audience Award at the 2022 Sundance Film Festival; Roadrunner: A Film About Anthony Bourdain, directed by Academy Award winner Morgan Neville and distributed in theaters by Focus Features; Apollo 11, directed by Todd Douglas Miller and featured on 2020 Oscars Shortlist in the category of Best Documentary Feature; RBG from Betsy West and Julie Cohen, which earned nominations for Best Documentary Feature and Best Original Song ("I'll Fight") at the 91st Academy Awards; Three Identical Strangers, directed by Tim Wardle, which was a nominee in the Best Documentary category at the 72nd British Academy Film Awards; Linda Ronstadt: The Sound of My Voice, directed by Rob Epstein and Jeffrey Friedman, which won Best Music Film at the 63rd Annual Grammy Awards; We Will Rise: Michelle Obama’s Mission to Educate Girls Around the World, which features Former First Lady Michelle Obama, Meryl Streep, Freida Pinto, and CNN’s Isha Sesay and was honored with a Television Academy Honors Award and a CINE Golden Eagle; and Blackfish, directed by Gabriela Cowperthwaite, which was nominated for the BAFTA Award for Best Documentary.

Personal life
Entelis is married to Charles Franklin Entelis and resides with her family in New York City.

She serves as the Chair of the Board of Visitors of the Columbia University Graduate School of Journalism.

References

CNN people
Vassar College alumni
Columbia University Graduate School of Journalism alumni
American women chief executives
CNN executives
Women television executives
Year of birth missing (living people)
Living people
21st-century American women
Primetime Emmy Award winners